Amanita princeps, the head man slender Caesar, is a species of agaric fungus in the genus Amanita. It is found in tropical China, Southeast Asia, and the Malay Peninsula down to Singapore. It is edible, and is collected in the wild and sold in local markets. Many incidents of mushroom poisoning have occurred among Laotian and Hmong immigrants to North America, since it is easily confused with Amanita phalloides, the death cap, in both appearance and odor.

See also
 List of Amanita species

References

princeps
Fungi of Asia
Fungi described in 1962
Taxa named by E. J. H. Corner